.ma is the Internet country code top-level domain (ccTLD) for Morocco. A local registrar with a local Moroccan company as administrative contact is needed to register a .ma or .co.ma domain name. Further restrictions are imposed on the registering of other second-level domains (such as .net.ma or .gov.ma).

History
In 1993, the Internet Assigned Numbers Authority (IANA) approved a request for delegation of the .ma ccTLD for administrative and technical contact to École Mohammadia d'ingénieurs.

In 1995 the technical management of the .ma domain was taken over by Maroc Telecom, who is still the (not formal) technical maintainer.

On 12 May 2006 IANA redesignated the administrative and technical contact for the domain, and made the Agence nationale de réglementation des télécommunications (ANRT) the only official registrar for the .ma ccTLD.

Within some years the ANRT will request the market to bid on a "Technical maintainer" license which is valid for five years. The new party will get 12 months to implement a provisioning system based on Extensible Provisioning Protocol. Automatic provisioning of .ma domains cannot be expected until 2013.

March 2015 the ANRT takes official control of .ma and launches new automatic provisioning.

Practical information
 Total hosts of .ma: 112,432 (2022-12-17)
Total internet users in Morocco: 19,021,000 (2016)
Total ADSL connection in Morocco: 550,000 (2007)

Second-level domains

Registration can be done directly at the second level, or at the third level beneath these names:

 المغرب.: Arabic Right-to-left TLD for Morocco, General use
 .ma: General use
 net.ma: Internet providers
 ac.ma: Educational institutions
 org.ma: Organizations
 gov.ma: Governmental entities
 press.ma: Press and publications
 co.ma: Commercial entities

Second top-level domain
A second top-level domain will be used for Morocco intended for domain names in the local language using Arabic characters. The string المغرب. has been registered and approved for this purpose, and was delegated to Morocco in April 2011, but it is not yet active (2015) and second level domains have not been granted yet.

References

External links
 IANA .ma whois information
 ANRT Registry website
 List of .MA Domain registrars
 .MA Domain whois

Country code top-level domains
Communications in Morocco
Mass media in Morocco
Internet in Morocco

he:סיומת אינטרנט#טבלת סיומות המדינות
sv:Toppdomän#M